The 2018 African Youth Games football tournament was the third edition of the African Youth Games men's football tournament. The men's football tournament was held in Algiers, Algeria between 19 and 27 July 2018 as part of the 2018 African Youth Games. The tournament was age restricted and open to men's under-15 national teams only.

Participating teams
Six teams participated to the final tournament. Libya and Democratic Republic of the Congo withdrew from the tournament.

Final tournament

Group stage

Group A

Group B

Knockout stage

Semi-finals

Bronze medal match

Gold medal match

Final ranking

External links
2018 AYG football tournament - 2018 AYG official website

Football
2018 in African football
2018
Youth association football competitions for international teams